The 41st Wisconsin Infantry Regiment was an infantry regiment that served in the Union Army during the American Civil War. It was among scores of regiments that were raised in the summer of 1864 as Hundred Days Men, an effort to augment existing manpower for an all-out push to end the war within 100 days.

Service
The 41st Wisconsin was organized at Milwaukee, Wisconsin, and mustered into Federal service on 8 June 1864.

The regiment was mustered out on September 24, 1864.

Casualties
The 41st Wisconsin suffered  18 enlisted men who died of disease, for a total of 18 fatalities.

Commanders
 Colonel George B. Goodwin

See also

 List of Wisconsin Civil War units
 Wisconsin in the American Civil War

References
The Civil War Archive

Notes

Military units and formations established in 1864
Military units and formations disestablished in 1864
Units and formations of the Union Army from Wisconsin
1864 establishments in Wisconsin